Kanasugara is a 2001 Indian Kannada-language romantic drama film directed by Karan. Film stars V. Ravichandran, Prema and Shashikumar, Hema Choudhary in lead roles. Kanasugara is a remake of 1998 Tamil film Unnidathil Ennai Koduthen. Music is composed by Rajesh Ramanath.

Film was released on 3 August 2001, The film received a very good response at the box office. Actress Prema won the Best Actress at South Filmfare Awards for this film.

Cast 

Ravichandran as Ravi
Prema as Sangeeta
 Shashikumar as Ajay
 Anu Prabhakar (Guest appearance)
 Srinath as Sangeeta's father
 Ambika as Sangeeta's real mother
 Hema Chaudhary as Sangeeta's Step - mother 
 Mandya Ramesh as Baalu
 Doddanna
 Tennis Krishna as Don Delli 
 Sana
 Sneha Eshwar 
 Guru Murthy 
 Mysore Ramanand as Police Constable 
 Honnavalli Krishna as Swamiji
 Mimicry Dayanand as House Owner
 V. Manohar as himself
 M. S. Umesh
 Sulochana Rai

Soundtrack 
All the songs are composed and scored by Rajesh Ramanath.  Almost all the songs are recomposed with the same tunes as in the original Tamil film composed by S. A. Rajkumar except the song "Om Namaha" which was reused from "Kaathoramai Kadhai" from Kannupadapoguthaiya also composed by Rajkumar.

References

External links 

 Kanasugara Songs

2001 films
2000s Kannada-language films
Indian romantic drama films
Kannada remakes of Tamil films
2001 romantic drama films
Films scored by Rajesh Ramnath